Forsteriini is a tribe of longhorn beetles of the subfamily Lamiinae.

Taxonomy
 Bactriola
 Camixaima
 Falsamblesthis
 Gisostola
 Helminda
 Huedepohlia
 Itacolomi
 Lustrocomus
 Neohebestola
 Nyctonympha
 Obereoides
 Proceroblesthis
 Pseudogisostola
 Saepiseuthes
 Spinoblesthis
 Udamina
 Yapyguara

References